Amit Verma (born 30 August 1987) is an Indian cricketer. He is a left-hander batsman and leg-break bowler. Verma made his first-class debut for Karnataka against Delhi in 2007–08 Ranji Trophy.

Ahead of the 2018–19 Ranji Trophy, he transferred from Assam to Goa. He was the leading run-scorer for Goa in the tournament, with 549 runs in nine matches.

References

External links 

Living people
1987 births
Indian cricketers
Goa cricketers
Karnataka cricketers
South Zone cricketers
Assam cricketers
Cricketers from Bangalore